Jamrud railway station  is a railway station in Jamrud, a town in the Khyber Agency, within Khyber Pakhtunkhwa, Pakistan.

History
Tracks connecting the Jamrud Railway Station to Landi Kotal via the Khyber Pass were completed in November 1925. The tracks have since fallen into disuse.

See also
 List of railway stations in Pakistan
 Pakistan Railways

References

External links

Railway stations in Peshawar District
Railway stations on Khyber Pass line